Rooh (English: Soul) is an Indian one hour horror supernatural thriller television series which was broadcast on Zee TV from 6 November 2004 to 6 August 2005. It used to air every Saturday at 8 P.M.

Each story has a different cast and crew. Shivam Nair, Anand Rai, Imtiaz Alam, Saurabh Sengupta, Sajit Warrier, Mohit Hussein, Mukul Abhyankar  are some of the directors who contributed to the series. Producers include Ronnie Screwvala, Zarina Mehta, Deven Khote, Gautam Mazumdar, Devkumar Dutta, Aditya Singh, Sunjoy Waddhwa and many more.

Plot
Each story focussed on a different aspect of paranormal activity such as black magic ghosts, zombies, phantoms, possessed objects, witches and wizards and sinister ghosts. It left viewers questioning about things around them.

Cast
Achint Kaur
Lavina Tandon 
Disha Vakhani
Devanshi Zaveri
Rohit Sachdeva
Reenaa A Garre
Priti Prakash
Priyanka
Rajesh Mishra
Anupam Bhattacharya
Namrata Thapa 
Divya Jagdale
Eric Nanda
Rocky Verma
Vishnu Sharma
 Shahab Khan in (2 episodes) 
 Karishma Tanna as Mamta (Episode 7)
 Vishal Singh as Ranjeet (Episode 7)
 Ami Trivedi as Priya (Episode 8)
 Amit Dolawat as Atul (Episode 8)
 Abhay Vakil as Mehul (Episode 8)
 Karuna Pandey as Swapna (Episode 8)
 Aashish Kaul
 Kavita Kaushik
 Moonmoon Banerjee as Sucheta (Episode 3) / Priya (Episode 29)
 Bhuvan Chopra as Ravi (Episode 3)
 Rushad Rana as Raj (Episode 29)
 Gunjan Walia
 Sharad Malhotra
 Tarun Khanna
 Sandeep Mohan
 Sonia Kapoor
 Sanjay Swaraj
 Vaquar Shaikh
 Abir Goswami as Akash (Episode 15)
 Vishal Watwani
 Gautami Kapoor
Javed Khan
Shanti Bhushan
Shyam Ban
Sameer Shanawade
Aadesh Bharadwaj
Shifali
Joydeep Mukherjee

References

External links

Rooh on Sphereorigins

Indian horror fiction television series
2004 Indian television series debuts
2005 Indian television series debuts
Zee TV original programming
Indian anthology television series